Hilton Rio de Janeiro Copacabana is a 110-metre 37-storey skyscraper hotel in the Leme neighbourhood of Rio de Janeiro, Brazil. It is the tallest building on Leme Beach.

History
The hotel originally opened in 1976 as the Hotel Meridien Copacabana, later Le Méridien Copacabana. In 2007, Starwood sold the building to Iberostar Hotels & Resorts, which closed the hotel and started a renovation of the building in the same year, which was eventually abandoned in 2008. In 2009, the hotel was sold again to Windsor Hotels for around R$170 million. After a refurbishment, it was reopened in January 2011 as the Windsor Atlântica Hotel. The hotel was sold to Blackstone in March 2017.  It converted to the Hilton Rio de Janeiro Copacabana on May 2, 2017.

References

External links
official website

Hotels in Rio de Janeiro (city)
Copacabana, Rio de Janeiro
Skyscraper hotels
Skyscrapers in Rio de Janeiro (city)
Hotel buildings completed in 1976
Hotels established in 1976
1976 establishments in Brazil
Skyscrapers in Brazil
Hilton Hotels & Resorts hotels